Nida Zuhal (born 24 June 1975) is a Turkish swimmer. She competed in two events at the 1996 Summer Olympics.

References

1975 births
Living people
Turkish female swimmers
Olympic swimmers of Turkey
Swimmers at the 1996 Summer Olympics
Place of birth missing (living people)
20th-century Turkish sportswomen